38050 Bias, prov. designation: , is a Jupiter trojan from the Greek camp, approximately  in diameter. It was discovered on 10 November 1998, by astronomers with the Lincoln Near-Earth Asteroid Research at Lincoln Lab's ETS in Socorro, New Mexico. The dark Jovian asteroid is one of the 70 largest Jupiter trojans and has a rotation period of 18.9 hours. It was named after the Athenian warrior Bias from Greek mythology.

Orbit and classification 

Bias is a dark Jovian asteroid orbiting in the leading Greek camp at Jupiter's  Lagrangian point, 60° ahead of the Gas Giant's orbit in a 1:1 resonance . It is also a non-family asteroid in the Jovian background population.

It orbits the Sun at a distance of 4.8–5.6 AU once every 11 years and 10 months (4,337 days; semi-major axis of 5.2 AU). Its orbit has an eccentricity of 0.08 and an inclination of 29° with respect to the ecliptic.

The body's observation arc begins with a precovery published by the Digitized Sky Survey and taken at the Siding Spring Observatory in August 1982, more than 16 years prior to its official discovery observation at Socorro.

Numbering and naming 

This minor planet was numbered on 28 March 2002. On 14 May 2021, the object was named by the Working Group Small Body Nomenclature (WGSBN), after Bias from Greek mythology. Bias was an Athenian warrior and stalwart who followed Menestheus, to prevent Hector from reaching the Greek ships.

Physical characteristics 

Bias has a V–I color index of 0.99, typical for most D-type asteroid. It is also an assumed C-type.

Rotation period 

Several rotational lightcurves of Bias have been obtained from photometric observations. In June 2006, Lawrence Molnar at Calvin University determined a rotation period of  hours with a brightness variation of 0.37 magnitude, using the Calvin-Rehoboth Robotic Observatory in New Mexico.().

In September 2008 observations at the Roque de los Muchachos Observatory gave a period of 18.854 hours with an amplitude of 0.22 magnitude, while astronomers at the Palomar Transient Factory obtained a period of 18.917 hours in the R-band in October 2010.

Diameter and albedo 

According to the surveys carried out by the Japanese Akari satellite and the NEOWISE mission of NASA's Wide-field Infrared Survey Explorer, Bias measures between 50.44 and 61.603 kilometers in diameter and its surface has an albedo between 0.056 and 0.133. The Collaborative Asteroid Lightcurve Link assumes a standard albedo for a carbonaceous asteroid of 0.057 and calculates a diameter of 61.04 kilometers based on an absolute magnitude of 9.8.

References

External links 
 Asteroid Lightcurve Database (LCDB), query form (info )
 Dictionary of Minor Planet Names, Google books
 Discovery Circumstances: Numbered Minor Planets (35001)-(40000) – Minor Planet Center
 Asteroid (38050) 1998 VR38 at the Small Bodies Data Ferret
 
 

038050
038050
Named minor planets
19981110